Gaute Melby Gundersen (born 13 June 1972) is a retired Norwegian athlete who specialised in the sprint hurdles. He represented his country at two outdoor and three indoor World Championships.

His personal bests are 13.62 seconds in the 110 metres hurdles (+1.5 m/s, Tønsberg 1997) and 7.70 seconds in the 60 metres hurdles (Piraeus 1998).

Competition record

1Did not finish in the final

References

1972 births
Living people
Norwegian male hurdlers
World Athletics Championships athletes for Norway